Mateus Barbosa Santos Criciúma (born 19 January 1999) is a Brazilian professional footballer who plays as a winger for Liga I club Farul Constanța.

Career
Santos started his football career as a junior at the academies of Paulista, Porto, Grêmio and Atlético Mineiro. He recorded his senior debut with the former club on 8 February 2017, in a 1–0 home defeat of Atibaia in the Campeonato Paulista Série A3.

On 23 July 2021, Santos joined FC Botoșani of Romania on a two-year contract. He made his debut on 6 August that year, in a 2–1 Liga I victory over UTA Arad.

References

External links
Mateus Santos at Liga Profesionistă de Fotbal 

1999 births
Living people
Brazilian footballers
Sportspeople from Minas Gerais
Association football wingers
Campeonato Brasileiro Série B players
Campeonato Brasileiro Série C players
Campeonato Brasileiro Série D players
Paulista Futebol Clube players
Clube Atlético Mineiro players
Esporte Clube São Bento players
Ituano FC players
Vila Nova Futebol Clube players
Liga I players
FC Botoșani players
FCV Farul Constanța players
Brazilian expatriate footballers
Brazilian expatriate sportspeople in Romania
Expatriate footballers in Romania